John Baird may refer to:

Sports
John Baird (American football), All-American football player
John Baird (Australian footballer) (born 1980), Australian rules footballer
John Baird (cyclist), former racing cyclist from New Zealand
John Baird (footballer, born 1870) (1870–1905), Scottish footballer
John Baird (footballer, born 1985), Scottish footballer playing for Forfar Athletic
John Campbell Baird (1856–1902), Scottish footballer

Politics and government
John Baird, Lord Newbyth (1620–1698), Scottish advocate, judge, politician and diplomat
John Baird, 1st Viscount Stonehaven (1874–1941), eighth Governor-General of Australia
John Baird (Canadian politician) (born 1969), Canadian politician and former cabinet minister
John Baird (Michigan politician) (1859–1934), Michigan State Representative and Senator

British MPs
Sir John Baird, 2nd Baronet (1686–1745), Scottish Member of Parliament for Edinburghshire
John Baird (North West Lanarkshire MP) (1852–1900), Member of Parliament, 1885–1886
John Baird (Wolverhampton MP) (1906–1965), British Labour Party Member of Parliament, 1945–1964
John George Alexander Baird (1854–1917), Member of Parliament for Glasgow Central

Military officers
John Baird (educator) (1795–1858), Irish-born British Army instructor
John Baird (RAF officer) (born 1937), British physician and retired Royal Air Force medical officer
John Baird (revolutionary) (1790–1820), Scottish commander in the "Radical War" of 1820
John Baird (Royal Navy officer) (1832–1908), Victorian British Admiral

Divines
John Baird (Irish divine) (died 1804)
John Baird (Scottish divine) (1799–1861)

Others
John Baird I (1798–1859), Glasgow architect
John Logie Baird (1888–1946), Scottish engineer, invented the first working television system
John Wallace Baird (1869–1919), Canadian psychologist
John Washington Baird (1852–1923), American chess master
John Baird, founder of the Create a Comic Project

See also
 Jon S. Baird, Scottish film and television director